The 1952 presidential election may refer to:
 1952 Chilean presidential election
 1952 Icelandic presidential election
 1952 Indian presidential election
 1952 Irish presidential election
 1952 Israeli presidential election
 1952 South Korean presidential election
 1952 United States presidential election